The men's 1500 metres race of the 2013–14 ISU Speed Skating World Cup 4, arranged in Sportforum Hohenschönhausen, in Berlin, Germany, was held on 6 December 2013.

Joey Mantia of the United States won, while Zbigniew Bródka of Poland came second, and Denis Yuskov of Russia came third. Jan Szymański of Poland won the Division B race.

Results
The race took place on Friday, 6 December, with Division B scheduled in the morning session, at 12:52, and Division A scheduled in the afternoon session, at 17:04.

Division A

Division B

References

Men 1500
4